Zagreb Snowflakes Trophy is an international, multi-level synchronized skating competition, held annually since 2001 in Zagreb, Croatia.  the competition is organized by Croatian Skating Federation and sanctioned by the International Skating Union.

Medalists

Senior teams

References

External links
 Official website of Zagreb Snowflakes Trophy

Synchronized skating competitions
Figure skating in Croatia
International figure skating competitions hosted by Croatia
Recurring sporting events established in 2001
Sport in Zagreb